The Annual Inner City Tournament is a Gaelic football tournament between Gaelic Athletic Association clubs from Inner City Dublin. The tournament first began in 1982 with O'Tooles GAC winning the inaugural competition.

Top winners

No winner in 1990
St Joseph's/OCB and St Joseph's/OCB 2nd team both reached the final in 2008 with the match ending in a draw. However the 2nd team did win 4-2 on a penalty shoot out to get the winners trophies but both the first and second team decided to share the cup.

External links
Official Dublin Website
Dublin on Hoganstand
Dublin Club GAA
Reservoir Dubs
Dublin Teams

Gaelic football competitions in County Dublin